Mission Dosti.com is an Indian Marathi soap opera created and produced by Ekta Kapoor under her banner Balaji Telefilms. The series premiered on 28 May 2012 and aired on Saam TV.

Plot
The series revolves around three characters DJ (Vrushsen Dabholkar), Sanjana (Anuradha Rajadhyaksh) and Ragini (Mansi Kulkarni) who create a website titled www.mission.com which turns into a revolution. The series explores how youngsters unite for these friends who created the website and problems faced by them.

Cast
 Vrishasen Dabholkar as DJ
 Mansi Kulkarni as Ragini 
 Anuradha Rajadhyaksh as Sanjana
 Rajan Tamhane
 Sumukhi Pendse
 Praful Samant

References

External links
 Official website

Balaji Telefilms television series
2012 Indian television series debuts
2012 Indian television series endings
Marathi-language television shows
Saam TV original programming